Washington Union may refer to:

 The Washington Union, defunct 1850s newspaper in Washington, D.C.
 The Washington Weekly Union, defunct 1850s newspaper in Washington, D.C.
Washington Union Station, train station, transportation hub, and leisure destination in Washington, D.C.
Union Station (Washington Metro), Metro station in Washington, D.C., serving Washington Union Station
Washington Theological Union, Roman Catholic graduate school of theology and seminary in Washington, D.C.
Washington Union High School, founded in 1892 in the rural community of Easton in Fresno County, California

See also
Union, Washington, census-designated place in Mason County, Washington
Washington Township, Union County, Ohio
Union Station (Tacoma, Washington)